David James Jenkins (1824 - 26 February 1891) was a Welsh shipowner and Liberal Party politician who sat in the House of Commons from 1874 to 1886.

Jenkins was the son of John Jenkins of Haverfordwest and his wife Mary Evans daughter of John Evans. He was educated at Teignmouth Grammar School. He served for several years in the merchant navy and in 1854 and 1855 commanded a troop ship in the Baltic.  In 1860, he founded the firm of Jenkins & Co in London which began owning ships in 1861 and sailed mainly to India and the Far East.

He contested Harwich at the 1868 general election,  without success. At the 1874 general election Jenkins was elected as a Member of Parliament (MP) for Penryn and Falmouth. He held the seat until the 1886 general election, when he was defeated by the Conservative Party candidate William Cavendish-Bentinck.

Jenkins died at the age of 66.

Family 
Jenkins married firstly Bessie Howe, daughter of Rev. John Howe of Cork, in 1851 and secondly Alice Nash of Malvern Wells in 1877.

His nephew Edward Jenkins was a barrister, novelist and MP for Dundee.

References

External links
 

1824 births
1891 deaths
Liberal Party (UK) MPs for English constituencies
Members of the Parliament of the United Kingdom for Penryn and Falmouth
UK MPs 1880–1885
UK MPs 1874–1880
Welsh businesspeople in shipping
19th-century Welsh businesspeople